The third cycle of America's Next Top Model debuted on September 22, 2004, and was hosted by model Tyra Banks.
It was the first cycle to gain partnership with cosmetics magnate CoverGirl and ran weekly commercials during the show named Beauty Tip of the Week with Jay Manuel and Elsa Benítez as well as the CoverGirl of the Week contest. The cast was increased to 14 contestants, and the season's catchphrase was, "Beauty In Progress."

The prizes for this cycle were:

 A modeling contract with Ford Models.
 A fashion spread and cover in Elle Magazine.
 A 100,000 contract with CoverGirl cosmetics.

The following prizes had been removed:

 A modeling contract with IMG Models.
 A fashion spread and cover in Jane Magazine.
 A cosmetics campaign with Sephora.

The international destinations during this cycle were Montego Bay, Jamaica (for one episode), and Tokyo, Japan, the show's first visit to Asia.

The winner was 19-year-old Eva Pigford from Los Angeles, California, with YaYa DaCosta placing as the runner up.

Contestants
(Ages stated are at the time of filming)

Episodes

Summaries

Call-out order

 The contestant was eliminated
 The contestant was eliminated outside of the judging panel
 The contestant won the competition

Average  call-out order
Casting call-out order and final two are not included.

Bottom two

 The contestant was eliminated after her first time in the bottom two
 The contestant was eliminated after her second time in the bottom two
 The contestant was eliminated after her third time in the bottom two
 The contestant was eliminated after her fifth time in the bottom two
 The contestant was eliminated outside of the judging panel
 The contestant was eliminated in the final judging and placed as the runner-up

Photo shoot guide
Episode 2 photo shoot: Swimsuits on the beaches of Jamaica
Episode 3 photo shoot: Nivea beauty shots
Episode 4 photo shoot: Lee Jeans topless group shot
Episode 5 photo shoot: Dooney & Bourke purses on roller skates
Episode 6 photo shoot: YJ Stinger energy drink on a trampoline
Episode 7 photo shoot: Alter-egos with Ford Mustang
Episode 8 photo shoot: Verragio diamonds beauty shot with a tarantula
Episode 9 commercial: Japanese Campbell's Soup commercial
Episode 11 photo shoot: Geishas in kimonos for T-Mobile phone
Episode 12 photo shoot: Harajuku-inspired motorcyclists
Episode 13 photo shoot: CoverGirl Wet Slicks Crystals print ad

Other cast members
 Jay Manuel – Photo Director
 J. Alexander – Runway Coach
Mathu Anderson – Make-Up Artist
Danilo – Hairstylist

Makeovers
 Julie - Trimmed and layered
 Kristi - Long chic bangs
 Jennipher - Cut to shoulder length and dyed blonde
 Kelle - Long wavy extensions
 Cassie - Long curly blonde weave
 Toccara - Wavy shoulder length brown extensions
 Nicole - Lucille Ball inspired cut and dyed red with matching eyebrows
 Norelle - Shaggy bob cut and braces removed
 Ann - Cut shorter with platinum blonde highlights
 Amanda - Long ice blonde extensions
 Yaya - Braids removed and acne treatment
 Eva - Cut shorter and dyed golden blonde

Post-Top Model careers 

 Eva Pigford, who now goes by Eva Marcille professionally, won a contract with CoverGirl, representation by Ford Models, and a spread in Elle. She has since appeared on the covers of Brides Noir, Women's Health and Fitness, Essence, IONA, and KING Magazine. She has also appeared in campaigns for Samsung, Apple Bottom Jeans, DKNY, and Red by Marc Ecko. Marcille also pursued an acting career, appearing in The Young and the Restless, House of Payne, and Let's Stay Together. She hosted the reality show My Model Looks Better Than Your Model. Marcille was on three seasons of Real Housewives of Atlanta from 2017 to 2020.
 YaYa DaCosta did some modeling work after the show, appearing in ads for companies such as Lincoln Townhouse, RadioShack, Sephora, Oil of Olay, Dr. Scholl's, and Garnier Fructis. She is best known as an actress, having appeared in television shows such as All My Children, Ugly Betty, and Chicago Med. DaCosta has appeared in a number of films, such as I Will Always Love You, Take the Lead, The Kids are Alright, Big Words, Honeydripper, Lee Daniels' The Butler, In Time, and Tron: Legacy.
 Amanda Swafford has had some modeling work since the show, including appearing in a campaign for Levi's Jeans.
 Ann Markley, who now goes by Annalaina Marks professionally, was signed by Wilhelmina Models in Chicago and has done some modeling since the show for brands including Lord and Taylor, Old Navy, and Jay Manuel beauty.
 Norelle Van Herk was signed by Dreamodels in Hong Kong.
 Nicole Borud moved to San Clemente, California to pursue acting.
 Toccara Jones was signed by Wilhelmina Models and has modeled for brands including Ashley Stewart, Avon, Torrid, New York and Company, and Target. She has appeared in Essence, Vibe Magazine,  and Smooth Magazine, and had a spread in Vogue Italia. She has appeared on 106 & Park, Celebrity Fit Club, Celebrity Paranormal Project, and The Tyra Banks Show. Jones also runs a lingerie company.
 Cassie Grisham received a degree in international communications from the University of Oklahoma and worked for DePuy.
 Kelle Jacobs had a spread in Source Magazine and worked in a corporate role at Estee Lauder.
 Jennipher Frost worked as a marketing manager for a restaurant in Las Vegas and married former football player Brian Urlacher in 2016.
 Kristi Grommet does not appear to have modeled since the show ended.
 Julie Titus does not appear to have modeled since the show ended.
 Leah Darrow modeled some in New York but quit to become a Catholic author and speaker.
 Magdalena Rivas does not appear to have modeled since the show ended.

Production Issues
In a 2020 Instagram livestream with J. Alexander, Jay Manuel admitted that the rumours that the contestants were detained in Japan upon arriving in Tokyo were “100% true”. He revealed that the judges had already arrived in Tokyo because they fly ahead of the contestants, but upon arriving in Tokyo, customs “thought they were hookers” and didn’t let them in the country.

Luckily, before they could be detained, production “put them back on a plane, flew them to Guam ... for two days ... and from there the girls got proper visas to enter the country”. J. Alexander also revealed that he was meant to meet the girls at the airport and was left waiting for them for hours because he hadn’t been told what was happening. This left him “mad, angry ... furious” because production “completely forgot” about him and he had travelled for “two hours” from Tokyo to the airport to meet them.

Jay also revealed that the show’s stylist was traveling with the contestants but that in Tokyo, they “don’t have showrooms like in a lot of ... European cities, so she traveled with trunks with the clothes for the photo shoots. But she was also “turned away” at customs, got a “black stamp” in her passport and was sent “back to New York”. However she took her trunks with her and production told Jay “guess what now, you’re styling”. They gave him money and him and J. Alexander had to buy all the clothes for the photo shoots in Harajuku whenever they had a free moment. He joked that after that experience “he never wants to style shoots again”.

Manuel has also admitted that the girls being turned away at customs was the “big disaster of Cycle 3” and “did mess up production”. Due to CoverGirl's partnership with ANTM as of Cycle 3, they had a bigger budget and so Manuel was able to produce a “really elaborate commercial which was what the girls were supposed to shoot when they landed in Tokyo”. He described how he built a “huge set” that took a “week to build” and a got a “famous director to shoot it” but once the girls were sent to Guam, production “tore it all down”. When the girls “finally showed up” in Tokyo, production said they couldn’t give Manuel any more money for a new commercial. Manuel says he was extremely angry and production told him it was his problem, which he claims is “very America’s Next Top Model production”.

Eventually they did the commercial, but the robes that the girls were wearing were actually the robes from Manuel’s and Alexander’s hotel, and they shot it on a “patio” with a “reality cam” and no proper lighting. The commercials ended up being judged “an hour later” and Manuel was “mortified”, saying it “looked horrible” and that he was “embarrassed to even say what happened”.

Trivia

 Jay Manuel and J. Alexander agreed on a May 2020 Instagram livestream that Cycle 3 “put ANTM on the map” with Manuel explaining that “Even with the Tokyo disasters, which ... drove me crazy ... it was still one of the most fun cycles, in a weird way, just because of everything that was going down.”

 Manuel also revealed that the real reason why Tiffany didn’t get into the house was because she didn’t pass the psychological evaluation at casting week, not because Tyra didn’t want her. He admitted that off-camera, Tyra told Tiffany that “can you get help?” and the network “paid for her to get counselling and allowed her to come back and audition for Cycle 4”.

 J Alexander admits that if that Cycle 3 was aired today, Yaya would have received a “lot of support“ after she was criticised for being overbearing in regards to being proud of being African.

 Jay Manuel has confirmed that he is still is in touch with the contestants, including Ann and Eva, saying he is “really good friends” with Ann. He also confirmed that he still is in contact with Eva “via text and dm now and then” and was actually “invited to her wedding”.

 Jay Manuel described Toccara’s elimination as “emotional”, describing at as “hard for anyone”, saying even Janice Dickinson cried. J. Alexander also admitted that Toccara should have gone further.

 Jay has revealed that the photoshoot with winner Eva Marcille and Tyra Banks actually happened 3 days before the Cycle 3 premiere party in Los Angeles before the airing of the final episode, with Manuel doing both their make-up. Miss J. said that Tyra actually shot with all three girls, including Yaya and Amanda, because they didn’t know who was going to win.

 Jay revealed that during one panel, Janice Dickinson “kinda passed out” but they just continued filming judging with the other four judges and just edited Janice in later.

 Manuel denied rumours than Ann only made it to the top 4 because Ford Models wanted her, explaining that agencies “for a fact ... could never put that type of pressure“ on the judges. However he did admit that model agencies would “float who they’d like” because they’d sit on the judging panels but they never controlled the judging.

References

External links
 

A03
2004 American television seasons
Television shows filmed in Jamaica
Television shows filmed in New York City
Television shows filmed in Japan